Mantua is an unincorporated community in Greene County, Alabama, United States.

History
Mantua was most likely named for Mantua, Italy. Settlers came to the area in the early 1800s from Spartanburg, South Carolina. Mantua was originally in Pickens County, but residents petitioned for it to become part of Greene County in the 1860s. A post office operated under the name Mantua from 1880 to 1989.

References

Unincorporated communities in Greene County, Alabama
Unincorporated communities in Alabama